Babken Nikolayi Arakelyan (February 1, 1912August 16, 2004) was an Armenian historian and archeologist. He specialized in ancient and medieval Armenian history, culture and art. He graduated from Yerevan State University in 1938. He was a professor and a full member (academician) of the Armenian Academy of Sciences since 1974. He headed the Institute of Archaeology and Ethnography between 1959 and 1990.

References

1912 births
2004 deaths
20th-century archaeologists
20th-century Armenian historians
People from Armavir Province
Yerevan State University alumni
Recipients of the Medal "For Courage" (Russia)
Recipients of the Order of the Red Banner
Recipients of the Order of the Red Banner of Labour
Recipients of the Order of the Red Star
Armenian archaeologists
Armenian educators